Gajendra Kumar Mitra (Bengali: গজেন্দ্র কুমার মিত্র) (11 November 1908 – 16 October 1994) was a Bengali writer. In the year 1959, he won the Sahitya Akademi Award in Bengali for his novel, Kolkatar Kāchhei (A Stone's Throw from Kolkata).

Life

Gajendra Kumar Mitra was born on 11 November 1908. He was a versatile writer. He wrote many novels, short stories, plays, essays and poems. Mitra also translated a few English novels into Bengali, such as Dickens's A Tale of Two Cities. He used to write with his left hand. His genuine love and concern for Bengali literature inspired him to co-found the famous Mitra and Ghosh Publishers. Mitra was childless. He died on 16 October 1994 in Calcutta (now Kolkata).

Mitra & Ghosh Publishers
Mr Mitra along with his friend Sumathanath Ghosh established Mitra & Ghosh Publishers on March 9, 1934.

Novels

 Kanta Prem
 Pānchajanya
 Rai Jāgo Rai Jāgo
 Kolkatar Kāchei (Translated as A Stone's Throw from Kolkata)
 Paush Phāguner Pālā
 Upakanthe
 Bahnibanyā
 Rātrir Tapashyā
   Pashaner Khuda

References
Aupanyāsik Gajendrakumar Mitra: Jīban O Sāhitya (Kolkata: Pustaka Bipaṇi, 2006.)

Bengali writers
Bengali-language writers
Recipients of the Rabindra Puraskar
Recipients of the Ananda Purashkar
1908 births
1994 deaths
 Writers from Kolkata